Mikhaylovka is a rural locality (a village) in Sukkulovsky Selsoviet, Yermekeyevsky District, Bashkortostan, Russia. The population was 36 as of 2010. There is 1 street.

Geography 
Mikhaylovka is located 24 km north of Yermekeyevo (the district's administrative centre) by road. Bogorodsky is the nearest rural locality.

References 

Rural localities in Yermekeyevsky District